Six Flags Entertainment Village was the working title for a proposed  entertainment complex in Gurnee, Illinois, across and west of Six Flags Great America, located near Interstate 94. Owned by Six Flags and developed by Prism Development Co., the complex would've cost million. Intended to generate over  a year, the complex was projected to draw in 400,000 visitors annually and would've been built in multiple phases. 

Phase one of the entertainment complex was planned for 1999, and phase two was planned in 2002 before the final date of opening was planned for 2000. Opposition to Six Flags Entertainment Village arose in 1998, with disapproval from the president of Long Grove, Illinois and a citizens group titled Citizens United for a Residential Village of Gurnee forming to cancel the project, citing congestion and rising tax prices for disapproval of the entertainment village. Plans for the complex fell through in 1999 after residents had mainly voted against the village.

History

1997: Announcement and planning 
Plans for a  entertainment complex were announced at a Gurnee board meeting on October 29, 1997. Described as "pedestrian-friendly," small shops, a theme park, resort, and a stadium were also included in the plans for the entertainment village. The feasibility of the entertainment village would be studied by a panel appointed by then-mayor of Gurnee, Richard Welton. A day later, the panel announced it would need more time to study and discuss the plans for the project, as they needed to develop recommendations on the project. 

Gurnee officials later created an oversight committee on November 3, 1997, to keep the Gurnee village board updated on details after a trustee voiced concerns about the board being "out of the loop" and would operate independently from another committee that operates with developer Prism Development. The details for the project were also elaborated, with the project including a four-star hotel, water theme park, and an 8,000- to 12,000-seat stadium complex. The Gurnee board postponed the appointment of the oversight committee a week after, on November 10, 1997, after the board had voted to invite Prism Development instead after a recommendation by Richard Welton that the board should be updated on the project's status before trustees were appointed for the oversight committee.

Prism Development proposed an interchange near Washington Street after stating it was "absolutely required" for the project "to become a reality," as it would divert traffic from the main entrance at Grand Avenue and would allow guests to instead get on both properties on either side. Originally, an interchange was planned in 1973 by Marriott Corporation on the highway but was rejected because the interchange could not lead into private property. Part of the plan also included widening Washington Street to become a four-lane road. Despite the proposition, consultants from Metro Transportation Group Inc. stated that the interchange would be necessary once later phases of the project began, with the estimation of phase one starting in 1999 and phase two starting in 2002. Additionally, the interchange would also require approval from the Illinois State Toll Highway Authority, Lake County, and the village of Gurnee. Mayor Richard Welton said the project was still preliminary and would have to go through the Plan Commission of Gurnee and the Village Board. However, Welton stated the interchange would create additional opportunities.

1998: Resident and government opposition 
In a letter to a Lake County board chair on June 10, 1998, village president of Long Grove, Illinois, Lenore Simmons, said Gurnee "failed to be a bad neighbor" after concerns over Six Flags Entertainment Village's potential to deplete highway funds to work on the four-lane expansion on Washington Street. Welton charged back by stating developments near Washington Street had to pay impact fees, including Gurnee Mills, which also had to pay million in infrastructure payments. Welton also stated the street was already congested before the proposal of the complex, and the complex would use to solve the problems.

The changes included a request for a special-use permit to use the planned site, initially zoned for industrial use. However, the zoning board disagreed with the proposition and suggested Six Flags and Prism request at a different time.

The Gurnee plan commission officially endorsed the proposal for Six Flags Entertainment Village in November 1998, although it sparked opposition within the village towards the entertainment village. Later that month, the 10-member citizens' group named Citizens United for a Residential Village of Gurnee (shortened to CURV) was formed, stating how commercial development is negatively impacting the village, and cited congestion as the main reason for opposition. In the following month, a petition by CURV was created so the village could include a question on every ballot whether or not the entertainment village should be built.

1999: Village vote and cancellation 
In early-February 1999, the question of whether or not the entertainment village should be built was included in the ballot after the petition had reached its signature goal. Later that month, on February 24, 1999, traffic planners had suggested expanding the Tri-State to Washington Street, which had planned to divert traffic from the Grand Avenue interchange. The suggestion came with opposition from business owners within the Grand Tri-State Business Park, citing that the park was a limited access area and did not want traffic towards the business park, affecting property values. The election results were released in April 1999, and it was revealed that more than half of Gurnee residents disagreed with the village board's plan to construct the Six Flags Entertainment Village. The project was officially canceled in October 1999 after three years of planning and development.

Complex layout

See also 

 Marriott's Great America (Maryland–Virginia), a proposed theme park which was canceled due to resident opposition
 Six Flags Hurricane Harbor Chicago, a water park next to Six Flags Great America, which opened in 2005

References 

Cancelled amusement parks
Six Flags Great America
Gurnee, Illinois
Cancelled projects
Former Six Flags theme parks